Stittsville (Ward 6) is a city ward in Ottawa, Ontario, Canada, represented on Ottawa City Council. It consists of the community of Stittsville in suburban Ottawa. Prior to the 2006 election, the Ward was known as Goulbourn Ward which consisted of the former Goulbourn Township (including Stittsville and Richmond). The ward was altered in 2006, by losing all of the rural parts of Goulbourn (including urban Richmond) and gaining a tiny bit of the former city of Kanata around the Canadian Tire Centre. The ward was created when Goulbourn was amalgamated into Ottawa in 2000. It was known as Stittsville-Kanata West Ward until 2010.

In 2014, the ward expanded to gain the newly built Blackstone subdivision from Rideau-Goulbourn Ward. Following the 2020 Ottawa Ward boundary review, the ward will gain new territory on its northern and southern edges to accommodate proposed housing developments.

Stittsville's current councillor is Glen Gower, who replaced Shad Qadri after defeating him in the 2018 election. Mr. Qadri replaced Janet Stavinga in the 2006 election, in which Ms. Stavinga did not run. She had held the ward since its creation.

City councillors
On regional council, the area was part of Western Townships Ward

Janet Stavinga (2000–2006)
Shad Qadri (2006–2018)
Glen Gower (2018–present)

Election results

2000 Ottawa municipal election
Following amalgamation, Goulbourn Mayor Janet Stavinga defeated regional councillor Betty Hill and Goulbourn's Ward 3 township councillor Steven Lewis.

2003 Ottawa municipal election

2006 Ottawa municipal election
Incumbent councillor Janet Stavinga decided against running for re-election, in the newly formed ward which lost most of its rural areas. The race to fill the seat is between Gilles R. Chasles and Shad Qadri. Chasles is a Conservative and a businessman, owning Danicks Data Systems. Qadri is also a businessman, operating Showbiz Entertainment and Gifts with his family.

2010 Ottawa municipal election

2014 Ottawa municipal election

2018 Ottawa municipal election

2022 Ottawa municipal election

References

External links
City of Ottawa
Map of Stittsville-Kanata West Ward

Ottawa wards